Australia is one of the leading teams in international motorcycle speedway with the country regarded as the birthplace of the sport in the 1920s. The team are five times champions of the world having won the sports premier team competition in 1976, 1999, 2001, 2002 and 2022.

Speedway World Cup & Speedway of Nations
The Australian team won its first World Team Cup in 1976 with captain John Boulger, Phil Crump, Billy Sanders, Phil Herne and reserve Garry Middleton, but had to wait over 30 years before winning three tournaments out of four, between 1999 and 2002. Key riding members of the title wins since 1999 include Jason Crump (undefeated through the 2001 World Cup rounds and Final), Leigh Adams, Ryan Sullivan and Todd Wiltshire who took part in all three wins, while Jason Lyons rode in two (1999 and 2002) and Craig Boyce rode in 2001.

The fifth success came in the 2022 Speedway of Nations (the new name for the World Cup) with the squad members being Jack Holder, Max Fricke and Jason Doyle.

Four times Australian champion Jim Airey is the only Australian rider to win the World Team Cup not riding for Australia. He won the 1971 Speedway World Team Cup in Wrocław, Poland, as part of the Great Britain team.

Key:+1,2... - bonus points gained by finishing behind teammate+1j,+2j... - extra points gained in joker ride

Team Under-21 World Championship

* Due to cost of travel and visa problems, Australia withdrew from the 2011 Final,

Honours

World Championships

World Champions

Individual World Championship
 1936 -  London, Wembley Stadium - Lionel Van Praag 26+3pts
 1938 -  London, Wembley Stadium - Bluey Wilkinson 22pts
 1951 -  London, Wembley Stadium - Jack Young 12+3pts
 1952 -  London, Wembley Stadium - Jack Young 14pts
 2004 - Jason Crump 158pts
 2006 - Jason Crump 188pts
 2009 - Jason Crump 159pts
 2012 - Chris Holder 160pts

Individual Under-21 World Championship
 1983* -  Lonigo, Pista Olimpia Terenzano - Steve Baker 13pts
 1992 -  Pfaffenhofen an der Ilm, Speedway Stadion Pfaffenhofen - Leigh Adams 14+3pts
 1995 -  Tampere, Ratinan Stadion - Jason Crump 13+3pts
 2009 -  Goričan, Stadium Milenium - Darcy Ward 13pts
 2010 -  Gdańsk,  Daugavpils,  Pardubice - Darcy Ward 30+3pts
 2016 -  King's Lynn,  Pardubice,  Gdańsk - Max Fricke 46pts
* Steve Baker's win in 1983 was when it was known as the European Under-21 Championship

Notable riders

 Leigh Adams • × * #
 Jim Airey × *
 Frank Arthur * †
 Steve Baker •
 Troy Batchelor *
 John Boulger × *
 Shane Bowes
 Craig Boyce × *
 Troy Butler *
 Jason Crump ♦ • × *
 Phil Crump × *
 Stephen Davies
 Glenn Doyle *
 Jason Doyle × *
 Ray Duggan †
 Vic Duggan * †
 Mark Fiora
 Max Fricke × • #
 Josh Grajczonek
 Max Grosskreutz * †
 Gordon Guasco †
 Gary Guglielmi
 Phil Herne
 Craig Hodgson # †
 Chris Holder ♦ *
 Jack Holder ×
 Vic Huxley * †
 Brady Kurtz *
 Aub Lawson * †
 Ken Le Breton †
 Bob Leverenz †
 Jason Lyons ×
 Travis McGowan #
 Garry Middleton ×
 Scott Norman
 Shane Parker
 Mick Poole
 Steve Regeling *
 Billy Sanders × * †
 Rory Schlein #
 Bob Sharp †
 Neil Street †
 Ryan Sullivan × * #
 John Titman *
 Chum Taylor *
 Lionel Van Praag ♦ †
 Bluey Wilkinson ♦ * †
 Todd Wiltshire × *
 Darcy Ward • #
 Davey Watt
 Cameron Woodward
 Jack Young ♦ †

♦ Individual World Champion• Under-21 World Champion× World Team Cup / World Cup Champion* Australian Champion# Australian Under-21 Champion† - Deceased

References

See also
 Australian under-21 speedway team
 Australian Individual Speedway Championship

National speedway teams
Speedway
Team
!